German submarine U-2503 was a Type XXI U-boat (one of the "Elektroboote") of Nazi Germany's Kriegsmarine, built for service in World War II. She was ordered on 6 November 1943, and was laid down on 2 May 1944 at the Blohm & Voss, Hamburg, as yard number 2503. She was launched on 29 June 1944, and commissioned under the command of Oberleutnant zur See Raimund Tiesler on 1 August 1944 .

Design
Like all Type XXI U-boats, U-2503 had a displacement of  when at the surface and  while submerged. The submarine was powered by two MAN SE supercharged six-cylinder M6V40/46KBB diesel engines each providing , two Siemens-Schuckert GU365/30 double-acting electric motors each providing , and two Siemens-Schuckert silent running GV232/28 electric motors each providing .

U-2503 was fitted with six  torpedo tubes in the bow and four  C/30 anti-aircraft guns. She could carry twenty-three torpedoes or seventeen torpedoes and twelve mines. The complement was five officers and fifty-two men.

Fate
On 3 May 1945, while on her way to Norway, U-2503 was in the Great Belt, near the Ömo Light Tower, when she was caught and attacked on the surface by Royal Air Force (RAF) Bristol Beaufighters of 236 Squadron and 254 Squadron, part of the Banff Strike Wing. U-2503 was struck in the area of the conning tower by at least one rocket, which caused severe damage and killed several crewmen and Kapitänleutnant Karl-Jürg Wächter. U-2503, burning badly, was beached off of Omø, with 13 dead and an unknown number of survivors. The remaining crew landed ashore and scuttled the boat with explosives the next day.

U-2503s location when scuttled, .

References

Bibliography

External links
 

Type XXI submarines
U-boats commissioned in 1944
U-boats sunk in 1945
World War II submarines of Germany
1944 ships
Ships built in Hamburg
U-boats scuttled in 1945
Maritime incidents in May 1945